Professor Harishchandra Abeygunawardena is a former Vice-Chancellor of University of Peradeniya.

Abeygunawardena holds a BVSc from the University of Peradeniya, together with an MSc and PhD from the University of Illinois. Since 1977 he has served on the academic staff of the Faculty of Veterinary Medicine and Animal Science at the University of Peradeniya and since May 2000 was the Dean of Veterinary Medicine and Animal Science. He served as the 14th Vice Chancellor of the University of Peradeniya from 1 August 2006 until July 2009. Following which he served as a member of the University Grants Commission.

References

Year of birth missing (living people)
Living people
Sinhalese academics
Academic staff of the University of Peradeniya
Alumni of Mahinda College
University of Illinois Urbana-Champaign alumni
Vice-Chancellors of the University of Peradeniya
Sri Lankan educators
Academia in Sri Lanka
Sri Lankan academics
Academics from Galle
People from Galle